Henry William Allan (2 April 1850 – 12 December 1926) was a Scottish rugby union international who represented Scotland in the 1873–74 Home Nations rugby union matches.

He played as a forward for Glasgow Academicals.

He represented Glasgow District against Edinburgh District in the world's first provincial match, the 'inter-city', on 23 November 1872.

He also represented Glasgow District against Edinburgh District in the 5 December 1874 match.

References

Scottish rugby union players
Scotland international rugby union players
Rugby union forwards
Glasgow District (rugby union) players
Glasgow Academicals rugby union players
1850 births
1926 deaths
Rugby union players from Glasgow